Pterocalla maculata is a species of ulidiid or picture-winged fly in the genus Pterocalla of the family Ulidiidae.

References

maculata
Insects described in 1989